The 1938 California gubernatorial election was held on November 8, 1938. This was the first election since 1894 in which a Democrat was elected Governor of California, as well as the first election since 1882 in which a Democrat won with more than 50% of the vote. Culbert L. Olson had defeated John F. Dockweiler and James Francis Thaddeus O'Connor for the Democratic nomination, while Frank F. Merriam defeated George J. Hatfield for the Republican nomination.

General election results

References
 Our Campaigns

California
1938
Gubernatorial
November 1938 events